Cordes Lakes is a census-designated place (CDP) in Yavapai County, Arizona, United States. The population was 2,058 at the 2000 census. The Agua Fria National Monument lies to the east and south of the community and Arcosanti is to the north.

Cordes Junction, at the intersection of Arizona State Route 69 and I-17, is located within the CDP of Cordes Lakes.

Geography

Cordes Lakes is located at  (34.312109, -112.106569).

Lying in the foothills of Prescott Valley, Cordes Lakes has common terrain of a middle latitude desert, including but not limited to tall long stretching hills, mesas, several species of cacti, and large rock formations.

The Cordes Lakes' back roads lead straight to the Agua Fria National Monument.

There is one shallow man-made lake that often dries up in the summer or all year, especially during times of drought.

Demographics

As of the census of 2000, there were 2,058 people, 866 households, and 582 families residing in the CDP. The racial makeup of the CDP was 97.0% White, 0.2% Black or African American, 0.9% Native American, 0.2% Asian, 0.2% Pacific Islander, 0.7% from other races, and 1.4% from two or more races.  6.2% of the population were Hispanic or Latino of any race.

There were 866 households, out of which 19.9% had children under the age of 18 living with them, 55.0% were married couples living together, 7.9% had a female householder with no husband present, and 32.7% were non-families. 26.6% of all households were made up of individuals, and 13.2% had someone living alone who was 65 years of age or older.  The average household size was 2.33 and the average family size was 2.77.

In the CDP, the population was spread out, with 21.2% under the age of 18, 4.9% from 18 to 24, 21.7% from 25 to 44, 27.1% from 45 to 64, and 25.1% who were 65 years of age or older.  The median age was 47 years. For every 100 females, there were 103.8 males.  For every 100 females age 18 and over, there were 103.6 males.

The median income for a household in the CDP was $29,097, and the median income for a family was $32,300. Males had a median income of $27,692 versus $16,250 for females. The per capita income for the CDP was $13,720.  About 12.6% of families and 17.7% of the population were below the poverty line, including 37.2% of those under age 18 and 7.1% of those age 65 or over.

Education
Residents are in the Mayer Unified School District.

See also
Census-designated places in Arizona

References

External links
 

Census-designated places in Yavapai County, Arizona